Man of Many Colors is an album by saxophonist Walt Weiskopf.

Background
This was Weiskopf's first quartet album since A World Away, in 1995. This was his seventh release for Criss Cross Jazz.

Music and recording
The album was recorded on December 12, 2001, in Brooklyn, New York. Six of the tracks are Weiskopf originals. "Triangle Dance" is played in 6/4 time. The final track, "When Your Lips Meet Mine", is a duet with pianist Brad Mehldau.

Reception
An AllAboutJazz reviewer commented that "Weiskopf and crew approach things in a manner that makes this so much more than yet another mainstream recital".

Track listing 
"Triangle Dance" (Weiskopf) – 7:22
"Haunted Heart" (Arthur Schwartz, Howard Dietz) – 7:36
"Together" (Weiskopf) – 5:45
"Man of Many Colors" (Weiskopf) – 7:08
"People" (Jule Styne) – 7:26
"NYC" (Weiskopf) – 6:51
"Petal" (Weiskopf) – 5:37
"When Your Lips Meet Mine" (Weiskopf) – 3:15

Personnel 
 Walt Weiskopf – tenor sax
 Brad Mehldau – piano
 John Patitucci – bass
 Clarence Penn – drums

References 

Criss Cross Jazz albums
2002 albums